The aboriginal cockroach (Periplaneta aboriginea) is a species of cockroach belonging to the family Blattidae. Unlike the related (and misnamed) Australian cockroach, this is an Australian native endemic, only recorded from the northern part of the Great Dividing Range in Queensland, as far north as the Cape York Peninsula.

This species, which is capable of flight, is usually found underneath tree bark.

References
Species description at Australian Faunal Directory

Cockroaches
Insects described in 1994